Cloud Master is a horizontally scrolling shooter released as an  arcade video game by Taito in 1988. Home versions were released for the Master System, PC Engine, and Famicom, with all save the Master System version released only in Japan. The PC Engine version of the game is titled . The Famicom version is titled Chuuka Taisen.

Gameplay
The player controls Mike Chen floating on a cloud, maneuvering around the screen and shooting balls of energy at flying enemies. Powerups can be collected for stronger and faster firepower. Some parts of the game stage have doors that give the player the opportunity to buy special bomb types with collectible credits. Each stage has its own mini-boss and big boss. The player restarts at certain checkpoints after losing a life.

Reception 
In Japan, Game Machine listed Cloud Master on their August 15, 1988 issue as being the sixteenth most-successful table arcade unit of the month.

Legacy
In 2008, Starfish SD, a company founded by former Hot-B employees, bought the rights from Taito and developed a remake for the Nintendo Wii. It was released under the title The Monkey King: The Legend Begins, dubbed Shin Chuuka Taisen: Michael to Meimei no Bouken in Japan. A Nintendo Switch port, titled Chuka Taisen, was released on September 6, 2018.

References

External links

1988 video games
Arcade video games
Horizontally scrolling shooters
MSX2 games
Master System games
Nintendo Entertainment System games
X68000 games
TurboGrafx-16 games
Video games about primates
Video games developed in Japan

Video games based on Chinese mythology